Seung-woo, also spelled Sung-woo, is a Korean masculine given name. The meaning differs based on the hanja used to write each syllable of the name. There are 17 hanja with the reading "seung" and 60 hanja with the reading "woo" on the South Korean government's official list of hanja which may be registered for use in given names.

People
People with this name include:

Sportspeople
Han Seung-woo (sport shooter) (born 1983), South Korean sport shooter
Choi Seung-woo (born 1989), South Korean track cyclist
Nam Seung-woo (born 1992), South Korean football midfielder (Belgian Second Division)
Ryu Seung-woo (born 1993), South Korean football forward (Bundesliga)
Lee Seung-woo (born 1998), South Korean football forward and midfielder (Spanish youth league)

Entertainers
Kim Seung-woo (born 1969), South Korean actor
Cha Seung-woo (born 1978), South Korean singer and actor
Cho Seung-woo (born 1980), South Korean actor 
Han Seung-woo (singer) (born 1994), South Korean singer 
Yoo Seung-woo (born 1997), South Korean singer

Others
Lee Seung-u (born 1959), South Korean writer

See also
List of Korean given names

References

Korean masculine given names